This is a list of people who have served as 
 Maj. Samuel Longbotham 13 April 1975 – 1983
 Granville Leveson-Gower, 5th Earl Granville 14 April 1983 to 7 December 1993
 John Morrison, 2nd Viscount Dunrossil 7 December 1993 – 22 March 2000
 Alexander Matheson,  27 April 2001 – 16 November 2016
 Mr Donald Martin 20 December 2016 – 21 March 2022
 Iain Macaulay 21 March 2022 – present

References
 

Western Isles
 
Outer Hebrides
Politics of the Outer Hebrides